Comfort Zone is the first studio album by Sector Seven. It was released in 1999 by Raw Energy.

Track listing
 "Comfort Zone
 "SRM"
 "Right Away"
 "What Went Wrong?"
 "Back And Forth"
 "Land Of Confusion"
 "Head First"
 "Eye To Eye"
 "Let It Slide"
 "No Way Around It"
 "Today"

External links
CHRW Radio

1999 albums
Sectorseven (band) albums